Shpykiv is an urban-type settlement in Tulchyn Raion (a district in Vinnytsia Oblast (province) in central Ukraine,  southwest of Kyiv and  northwest of Tulchyn, the raion center. Population: . It is located in the historic region of Podolia.

History 

Spykov was first mentioned in documents dating from the 16th century during the Polish-Lithuanian period. Its first owners were gentry, one of whom sold Spykov to the princes of Ostrozky.

Until the Second partition of Poland Szpików was part of the Bracław Voivodeship of the Lesser Poland Province of the Polish Crown. It was a small town, owned by the houses of Ostrogski, Zamoyski, Koniecpolski, Potocki and Świejkowski. Leonard Marcin Świejkowski built a Baroque palace in Szpików.

From 1793 to 1917 it was a town in Bratslav uyezd in Podolian Governorate of the Russian Empire. It formerly had a significant Jewish community, which numbered 1,875 in 1900. In January 1989, the population was 4,285 people In January 2013, the population was 3,355 people.

References

Urban-type settlements in Tulchyn Raion
Podolia Governorate
Shtetls